A Treatise on the Family is a book by Nobel-winning economist Gary Becker.

Editions
Gary S. Becker (1981, Enlarged ed., 1991). A Treatise on the Family. Cambridge, MA: Harvard University Press. . Publisher's description and scrollable preview link.

See also
Family economics

1981 non-fiction books
Economics books
Family economics
Treatises